Palazzo Capua, also known as Capua Palace, is an early 19th-century Neoclassic palace in Sliema, Malta. It was built by a Russian banker who named it Selma Hall. It later came into the possession of the Prince of Capua Carlo de Borbon, and his wife Penelope Caroline Smyth, for whom it is still named today. 

At the time of construction it was the most attractive building of the area, surrounded by extensive country views when most of Sliema was underdeveloped. It has always been identified by its Neoclassic architecture, notably with the use of columns on its façade. The area where the place is found has been built up throughout the 19th and 20th centuries. Since the early 20th century the Capua Palace has gone under different adaptive reuse. The building now hosts a boutique hotel while the St James Capua Hospital was built on the site of its former gardens.

The architecture of the building is attributed to William Scamp.

Further reading
Historical palace to form part of hotel. Times of Malta. 7 November 2003.
Capua Palace refurbished. Times of Malta. 23 November 2003.
Palazzo turned into conference centre. Times of Malta. 28 July 2005.
Ripard, Joanna (18 December 2008). Palazzo Capua added to The Palace's portfolio. Times of Malta. 
Palazzo Capua has its own wines. Times of Malta. 10 June 2012.

Main details
Capua Palace incorporated in Victoria Hotel set-up. Times of Malta. 21 August 2005. Archived from the original on 6 September 2016.

Palazzo Capua, Sliema. Malta-Vacations. 1996–2008. Archived from the original on 23 June 2016.
Women's Places (Itineraries). From Floriana to Naxxar via Sliema (Ch 19). p. 387–388.
p=234

References

Capua
Hotels in Malta
Sliema